Matty may refer to:

 Matty (name), a list of people and fictional characters with the nickname, given name or surname
 Matty, Hungary, a village in Baranya County
 Matty Island, a Canadian arctic island
 Former name of Wuvulu Island
 Matty, nickname for Matthew Humberstone School in Lincolnshire
 Matty, a moniker used by Canadian musician Matthew Tavares
 Matty (fabric), a type of cloth used for linens and embroidery.

See also
 "Matty Ice", nickname of Matt Ryan (American football) (born 1985), American National Football League quarterback
 Maty (disambiguation)
 Mattie (disambiguation)
 Matti (disambiguation)